Almost Famous is the second solo studio album by American rapper 8Ball. The album was released on November 20, 2001, by JCOR Entertainment and 8 Ways Entertainment. The album features guest appearances from Koncrete, Carl Thomas, MJG, Cl'Che, P. Diddy, Ludacris, Dorasel and Thorough.

Track listing

Charts

Weekly charts

Year-end charts

References

2001 albums
8Ball & MJG albums